The 2016 British Indoor Athletics Championships was an indoor track and field competition held from 27–28 February 2016 at the English Institute of Sport, Sheffield, England. A full range of indoor events were held. It served as qualification for the British team at the 2016 IAAF World Indoor Championships.

Championship records were set in both the men's and women's 3000 metres race walk, with Tom Bosworth setting the men's time of 10:58.21 minutes and Bethan Davies claiming the women's mark in 12:44.99 minutes.

Medal summary

Men

Women

References 

 

British Indoor Championships
British Indoor Athletics Championships
British Indoor Athletics Championships
Sports competitions in Sheffield
Athletics Indoor
Athletics competitions in England